George Howping Wu (born November 3, 1950) is an American federal judge of the United States District Court for the Central District of California.

Education
Born in New York City, Wu is the great-grandson of Wu Tingfang, the first ethnically Chinese barrister in England, and the grandson of Wu Chaoshu. He is the son of Sylvia Wu, founder of the restaurant "Madame Wu's Garden" in Santa Monica. He received a Bachelor of Arts degree from Pomona College in 1972 and a Juris Doctor from the University of Chicago Law School in 1975. Wu was also a law clerk for Judge Stanley Barnes, United States Court of Appeals for the Ninth Circuit, 1976-1977 and in 1979.

Legal practice
After clerking for Judge Barnes, Wu was in private practice in Los Angeles, California. He was also briefly an assistant professor of law at the University of Tennessee College of Law from 1979 to 1982. Additionally, he was an Assistant United States Attorney of the U.S. Attorney's Office, Central District of California from 1982 to 1989 and from 1991 to 1993.

State judicial service
In 1993, Wu was appointed as a state court judge to the Los Angeles Municipal Court. In 1996, he was elevated to a California Superior Court trial judge on the Los Angeles Superior Court and held this post until 2007.

Federal judicial service
Wu is a United States District Judge of the United States District Court for the Central District of California, sitting in Los Angeles. Wu was nominated to the Federal Bench by President George W. Bush on January 9, 2007, to a seat vacated by Ronald S.W. Lew. He was confirmed by the United States Senate on March 27, 2007, and received his commission on April 17, 2007.

See also
List of Asian American jurists

Sources

References

1950 births
Living people
American jurists of Chinese descent
Assistant United States Attorneys
California state court judges
Judges of the United States District Court for the Central District of California
Pomona College alumni
Superior court judges in the United States
United States district court judges appointed by George W. Bush
21st-century American judges
University of Chicago Law School alumni
University of Tennessee faculty
Lawyers from New York City
Wu family